Jesse Larner (born November 2, 1963) is a New York-based writer on politics and culture. He is the author of Mount Rushmore: An Icon Reconsidered (Nation Books, 2002) and Forgive Us Our Spins: Michael Moore and the Future of the Left (Wiley and Sons, 2006.) His work has been featured on Radio Nation, the Kojo Nnamdi Show, and NPR. He has appeared in the documentary film Manufacturing Dissent (2007), Penn & Teller's investigative television program, and on PBS' "History Detectives." He maintains a blog at the Huffington Post.

References
 Brief bio at The Nation
 Review of "Forgive Us Our Spins"

External links
 Huffington Post
 Excerpt from "Mount Rushmore"
 "Forgive Us Our Spins" web site

1963 births
Living people
American political writers
American male non-fiction writers
American social sciences writers